Bazré is a town in south-central Ivory Coast. It is a sub-prefecture of Sinfra Department in Marahoué Region, Sassandra-Marahoué District. The town is seven kilometres west of the border of Yamoussoukro Autonomous District and 12 kilometres northwest of the Gôh-Djiboua–Sassandra-Marahoué–Yamoussoukro tripoint.

Bazré was a commune until March 2012, when it became one of 1126 communes nationwide that were abolished.

In 2014, the population of the sub-prefecture of Bazré was 34,781.

Villages
The 17 villages of the sub-prefecture of Bazré and their population in 2014 are:

Notes

Sub-prefectures of Marahoué
Former communes of Ivory Coast